The 2019 season for the  cycling team began in January.

2019 roster

Riders who joined the team for the 2019 season

Riders who left the team during or after the 2018 season

Season victories

National, Continental and World champions

References

External links
 
 

Bora-Hansgrohe
Bora–Hansgrohe
2019 in German sport